The following highways are numbered 643:

United States